Athletics competitions at the 1989 Bolivarian Games were held at the Estadio José Pachencho Romero in Maracaibo, Venezuela, between January 14–25, 1989.

A detailed history of the early editions of the Bolivarian Games between 1938
and 1989 was published in a book written (in Spanish) by José Gamarra
Zorrilla, former president of the Bolivian Olympic Committee, and first
president (1976-1982) of ODESUR.  Gold medal winners from Ecuador were published by the Comité Olímpico Ecuatoriano.

A total of 40 events were contested, 23 by men and 17 by women.

Medal summary

Medal winners were published.

Men

Women

Medal table (unofficial)

References

Athletics at the Bolivarian Games
International athletics competitions hosted by Venezuela
Bolivarian Games
1989 in Venezuelan sport